Serap may refer to:

 Serap Aktaş (born 1971), Turkish middle and long-distance runner
 Serap Yazıcı (born 1963), Turkish academic
 Serap Yücesir (born 1973), Turkish basketball player
 Serap (vaccine), a trade name for a diphtheria, pertussis (whooping cough), and tetanus vaccine

References

Turkish feminine given names